Abdelbaki Sahraoui was a co-founder of the Islamic Salvation Front (FIS) in Algeria.

He was born in 1910 in Constantine, Algeria.  In 1926, he joined the circle of Sheikh Mubarak el-Mili.  Five years later, he was conscripted by the French army, where he spent two years.  He then moved to Algiers, where he was involved with the Muslim Scholars' Society. In 1990, he helped found the FIS; after the Algerian Civil War began, he fled to Paris, from which he preached in favor of armed struggle—jihad—against the Algerian government. However, he opposed the extension of the jihad to France, and was assassinated because of this in Paris, on 11 July 1995, by the Armed Islamic Group. His death was followed by a series of bombings in France.

References

Sources
 Interview

1910 births
1995 deaths
People from Constantine, Algeria
Islamic terrorism in France
Terrorism deaths in France
Algerian Islamists
Assassinations in France